Pilsrundāle is a village in Rundāle Parish, Bauska Municipality in the Semigallia region of Latvia, approximately 40 kilometers from Jelgava. Pilsrundāle had 862 residents as of 2006. Rundāle Palace is located in Pilsrundāle.

Towns and villages in Latvia
Bauska Municipality
Bauske County
Semigallia